Ukraine competed at the 2020 Winter Youth Olympics in Lausanne, Switzerland from 9 to 22 January 2020.

Artem Darenskyi (figure skating), Yulianna Tunytska (luge) and Anton Korchuk (ski jumping) qualified to represent Ukraine at the 2022 Winter Olympics.

Medalists

Medals in Mixed-NOC events
Medals awarded to participants of mixed-NOC are not counted towards the individual NOC medal tally.

Competitors
The following is the list of number of competitors participating at the Games per sport.

Alpine skiing

Boys

Girls

Biathlon

Boys

Girls

Mixed

Cross-country skiing

Distance

Sprint

Cross

Figure skating

Four Ukrainian figure skaters achieved quota places for Ukraine based on the results of the 2019 World Junior Figure Skating Championships. Ukraine also received one men's singles quota based on the results of the 2019–20 ISU Junior Grand Prix.

Singles

Couples

Mixed NOC team trophy

Freestyle skiing

Ice hockey

 3x3 mixed tournament

Luge

Boys

Girls

Team

Nordic combined

Short track speed skating

Two Ukrainian skaters achieved quota places for Ukraine based on the results of the 2019 World Junior Short Track Speed Skating Championships.

Boys

Girls

Skeleton

Girls

Ski jumping

Snowboarding

Snowboard cross

Team ski-snowboard cross

See also
Ukraine at the 2020 Summer Olympics

References

2020 in Ukrainian sport
Nations at the 2020 Winter Youth Olympics
Ukraine at the Youth Olympics